INS Kiltan (P30) is an anti-submarine warfare corvette of the Indian Navy built under Project 28. It is the third of four Kamorta-class corvettes. The ship was built by the Garden Reach Shipbuilders and Engineers (GRSE), Kolkata, launched on 26 March 2013, and commissioned on 16 October 2017. Kiltan represents a leap forward in the Navy's attempts at localisation with as much as 90% of its content drawn from India itself.

History 
The keel of Kiltan was laid in August 2010 and it was launched in Kolkata on 26 March 2013 by Chitra Joshi, wife of Admiral D. K. Joshi, the Chief of Naval Staff. The ship cost an estimated 1,700 crores. The ship takes its name from the Kiltan Island, a coral island that is part of India's archipelagic Union Territory of Lakshadweep.

Kiltan was handed over to the Navy by the GRSE on 14 October 2017, and was commissioned into the Navy’s Eastern Naval Command in Visakhapatnam on 16 October 2017, in the presence of Indian Defence Minister Nirmala Sitharaman and Navy chief Admiral Sunil Lanba.

Design 
The Kamorta-class has been designed by the Indian Navy’s Directorate of Naval Design as part of Project 28. It is capable of fighting under nuclear, biological and chemical environments. It will be a frontline warship of the Indian Navy with advanced stealth features and a low radar signature that enhances its anti-submarine warfare capability. The ship will have a complement of 17 officers and 106 sailors.

Features 
Kiltan is India's first ship to have a superstructure of carbon fibre composite material that has been integrated with its main hull, resulting in lower top weight and maintenance costs and improved stealth features. GRSE thus became the first defence shipyard in India to successfully fuse the carbon composite superstructure with the hull.

Kiltan is to be armed with a range of Indian developed cutting-edge weapons and sensors including "a medium-range gun, torpedo tube launchers, rocket launchers and a close-in weapon system". The ship will also contain an integrated communication system and an electronic warfare system.

Gallery

References 

Kamorta-class corvettes
Ships built in India
2013 ships
Corvettes of the Indian Navy